Christopher Welton Babbidge (born March 14, 1949) is an American politician who is currently representing the 8th district in the Maine House of Representatives since 2014.

Babbidge previously served in the Maine House of Representatives representing the 141st district from 2002 to 2008.

References 

1949 births
Democratic Party members of the Maine House of Representatives
University of Maine alumni
People from Kennebunk, Maine
Living people
South Portland High School alumni